Eugène Ogé (5 May 1861, Paris – 24 March 1936, Paris) was a French poster artist and illustrator.

Biography
He began as an apprentice to Charles Verneau (1850-1950), a printer who specialized in posters, and became a lithographer. During this period he made the acquaintance of several notable poster artists, including Adolphe Léon Willette, Jean-Louis Forain and Théophile Alexandre Steinlen. In his spare time, he studied painting at the Académie Julian and developed an admiration for Jules Chéret; an innovator in poster design.

In the 1890s, he opened his own workshop and began designing posters, initially under contract to Verneau, then with Pierre Vercasson. He gradually developed his own style, moving away from the opulent women favored by Chéret. By 1900, he worked almost exclusively with caricatures and established himself with his famous poster for the "Billards Brunswick", featuring three bald men.

During the war, he made very few posters; focusing instead on rubber models and patterns for advertising balloons.

Selected works

References

Further reading
Alain Weill, L'Affiche dans le monde, Paris, Somogy, 1984, p.47 

External links

More posters by Ogé @ the Centre de Documentation des Musées

French poster artists
1861 births
1936 deaths